Parapara or Parapara de Ortíz is a small city in Guárico, Venezuela. Parapara is also a parish (parroquia) of the Juan Germán Roscio Municipality. The city takes its name from an indigenous word for the fruit of the paraparo tree (Sapindus saponaria).

History
It was founded in 1660. Alexander von Humboldt travelled through this region in 1800 and described it in his Personal narrative of travels to the equinoccial regions. At the time the village's main source of income was the exploitation of gypsum, which was sent to Caracas.

President Joaquín Crespo spent many years of his life here.

Important buildings

House of Culture Felix Manuel Belisario

Important people
Place of birth of the famous and beloved Papaito

External links
 Parapara's House of Culture
 Parapara in Venezuelan politics (New York Times) 

Populated places in Guárico
Populated places established in 1660
1660 establishments in the Spanish Empire